Federico Smith (Frederick Anthony Smith, Manhattan, New York, United States, 1929 – Matanzas, Cuba, 1977) was a Cuban composer from American origin.

Biography

Composer and professor Federico Smith was born in Manhattan, New York on March 2, 1929.
Smith began his musical studies in his country, and in 1950 travelled to Mexico where he lived for the next 12 years. There, Smith continued his studies and contributed as a music critic to the "Política" magazine, an important leftist Mexican publication. That participation suggests an ideological tendency that had already manifested in his involvement with American communist organizations and his studies of Marxist philosophy.

In 1962, Federico Smith travelled to Havana, Cuba, invited by renowned Mexican artist and director Alfonso Arau with the purpose of collaborating in the reorganization project of the "Teatro Musical de La Habana", and in Cuba he stayed until his decease in 1977. The purpose of the "Teatro Musical de La Habana" project was to create a presentation that may include pantomime, dance, song and music hall performance, based on a popular style and inspired by de English vaudeville, that was closely related to the musical comedy. Smith's tasks included from the composition of musical shows to the actors training.

Due to his professional prowess and deep knowledge of mathematics, art, politics and other academic disciplines, Federico Smith was considered a brilliant intellectual with hints of genius during his lifetime; but his professional career, that included musical composition, pedagogy and musical criticism, was negatively influenced by a noticeable addiction to alcohol and tobacco that most probable caused his early decease.

Smith lived almost six years in the Matanzas province, from mid-1971 until his passing in 1977; and in that city he developed an outstanding professional and creative activity as a composer, professor and conductor.

Maestro Smith founded an organization in Matanzas called Siglo XX, with the purpose of "promoting the music of our times and all times; especially the Cuban and Latin-American music". Among the activities developed by that cultural organization we should mention the first performance in Cuba of the "Six metamorphoses after Ovid" by Benjamin Britten, and the interpretation of L'histoire du soldat from Igor Stravinsky.

The decease of Federico Smith occurred in total isolation, when he was just 48 years old, probably induced by an untreated bronchial pneumonia; although it is also possible that it would be related to a marked physical decay produced by alcoholism.

Academic background

According to a concert program from the group "Nueva Música de México" (New Music of Mexico), Federico Smith began his musical training in the city of Los Angeles, California. He also declared in an employment form to have concluded three years of University training in 1949. In a composer's biography preserved by the Cuban "Casa de las Américas", some piano courses with professor Klaus Goetzer are mentioned.

Federico Smith travelled to Mexico in 1950, a country where he was going to live during the next 12 years; between the D. F. and the Michoacan State. In 1951, Smith entered the "Conservatorio Nacional de Música" of Mexico, where he underwent and concluded studies of musical composition and was an active member of the Students Society. There he found in Carlos Jiménez Mabarack a valuable educator committed to the youngest generations. Several records indicate that he received training in composition and counterpoint from Blas Galindo, analysis from Rodolfo Halfter and instrumentation from José Pablo Moncayo.

Professor

Smith worked as professor of harmony, musical analysis, music history and composition at the National Art Schools (Cuba), from 1963 to 1966, and there he served as guide and support to many young musicians that, at a later time, were going to be excellent professionals. His interest for the utilization of mathematic models in analysis and musical composition exerted an important influence in the development of composition techniques such as aleatorism, stochastic and electro-acoustic music in Cuba.

At a later time, between 1969 and 1972, Smith took part in the group of professors that imparted substantial knowledge to the members of a group called "Experimental Sound Group" (GESI) at the Cuban film institute ICAIC.

Composer

Federico Smith composed numerous works for concerts, radio, TV and cinema; which were characterized by their innovative and experimental style, and in 1966, he collaborated as an arranger and composer with the Cuban Institute of Radio and Television (ICRT).

Other activities

During his stay in Mexico, Federico Smith worked as composer, professor and promoter of the Escuela de Danza (Dance School) of the Instituto Nacional de Bellas Artes. He also participated in the group "Nueva música de México" (New music from Mexico) and lived with the indigenous communities of the Sierra Purépecha, in the Michoacan State, where he developed important ethnological studies. He also collaborated as music critic for the "Política" magazine, between December 1960 and 1962; and took Mathematics classes at the "Universidad Autónoma de México" (UNAM).

Awards

Federico Smith received the following awards at the "26 de Julio" National Composition Awards Contest:

 1969 – Sympbonic Music Award: Música para dos saxofones y orquesta
 1971 – Chamber Music Award: Música para orquesta No. 3
 1973 – Choral Music Award: Versos sencillos
 1975 – Symphonic Music Award: Matanzas 281
 1976 – Symphonic Music Award: Carta abierta
 1976 – Chamber Music Mention: Quinteto

Partial list of works 

 Music for the show ¡Oh, la gente!
 Trio - oboe, guitar y percussion
 "Música para dos saxofones y orquesta"
 Concierto - oboe and string quartet
 Carta abierta – Sting orchestra and narrator. Musicalization of the "Versos sencillos" of José Martí. Mixed Choir.
 Bicinia – two bassoons
 Matanzas 281 – Homage to the 281 Anniversary of the City of Matanzas foundation – 1974 – Symphony orchestra, band, mixed choir, 4 narrators, batá drums and electro-acoustics.

See also

Music of Cuba

References

External links 

1977 deaths
Male classical composers
Cuban classical composers
Cuban composers
Male composers
1929 births
20th-century male musicians
Cuban male musicians